The 1984 Holy Cross Crusaders football team was an American football team that represented the College of the Holy Cross as an independent during the 1984 NCAA Division I-AA football season. The Crusaders ranked No. 15 nationally and did not qualify for the postseason.

In their fourth year under head coach Rick E. Carter, the Crusaders compiled an 8–3 record. Bill McGovern and Peter Muldoon were the team captains.

As in the previous year, Holy Cross began the campaign with a long winning streak (seven games), and was ranked as high as No. 2 in the weekly national rankings. Two late-season losses to Division I-AA foes, however, dropped them out of the upper echelon. Their third loss, in a game played after the final rankings were released, was to Division I-A powerhouse Boston College on the day that BC quarterback Doug Flutie won the Heisman Trophy. 

Holy Cross played its home games at Fitton Field on the college campus in Worcester, Massachusetts.

Schedule

References

Holy Cross
Holy Cross Crusaders football seasons
Holy Cross Crusaders football